1608 Muñoz, provisional designation , is a Flora asteroid from the inner regions of the asteroid belt, approximately  in diameter. It was discovered on 1 September 1951, by Argentine astronomer Miguel Itzigsohn at the La Plata Astronomical Observatory, in La Plata, Argentina. The S-type asteroid has a rotation period of 5.3 hours. It was named after , one of the assistant astronomers at the discovering observatory.

Orbit and classification 

Muñoz is a member of the Flora family, a giant asteroid clan and the largest family of stony asteroids in the main-belt. It orbits the Sun in the inner asteroid belt at a distance of 1.8–2.6 AU once every 3 years and 3 months (1,203 days; semi-major axis of 2.21 AU). Its orbit has an eccentricity of 0.17 and an inclination of 4° with respect to the ecliptic. It was first imaged on a precovery taken at the Lowell Observatory in November 1948, extending the body's observation arc by 3 years prior to its official discovery observation.

Naming 

Muñoz was involved in computational and observational work on minor planets for many years and also took an active part in site testing for the Argentine telescope, also known as the 85-inch or 2.15-meter Jorge Sahade Telescope (also see ). The official naming citation was published by the Minor Planet Center on 1 August 1980.

Physical characteristics 

Being a Florian asteroid, Muñoz is likely a stony, relatively bright S-type asteroid.

Rotation period 

Muñoz is a target of the Photometric Survey for Asynchronous Binary Asteroids (BinAstPhot Survey) led by astronomer Petr Pravec at the
Ondřejov Observatory in the Czech Republic. In September 2017, two rotational lightcurves were obtained from photometric observations by Pravec in collaboration with Serbian astronomer Vladimir Benishek at Belgrade Observatory, who observed the asteroid over three subsequent nights at Sopot Astronomical Observatory .

Diameter and albedo 

According to the surveys carried out by the Japanese Akari satellite and the NEOWISE mission of NASA's Wide-field Infrared Survey Explorer, Muñoz measures between 6.15 and 7.8 kilometers in diameter and its surface has an albedo between 0.265 and 0.40. The Collaborative Asteroid Lightcurve Link assumes an albedo of 0.24 – derived from 8 Flora, the principal body of the Flora family – and calculates a diameter of 7.82 kilometers based on an absolute magnitude of 12.7.

Notes

References

External links 
 Asteroid Lightcurve Database (LCDB), query form (info )
 Dictionary of Minor Planet Names, Google books
 Asteroids and comets rotation curves, CdR – Observatoire de Genève, Raoul Behrend
 Discovery Circumstances: Numbered Minor Planets (1)-(5000) – Minor Planet Center
 
 

001608
Discoveries by Miguel Itzigsohn
Named minor planets
19510901